Los Cerritos is an unincorporated community in Conejos County, in the U.S. state of Colorado.

History
A post office called Los Cerritos was established in 1889, and remained in operation until 1914. Los Cerritos is a name derived from Spanish meaning "the little hills".

References

Unincorporated communities in Conejos County, Colorado
Unincorporated communities in Colorado